Foster Sylvers Featuring Pat & Angie Sylvers is the second album by Foster Sylvers from the R&B group The Sylvers, this time featuring older sisters Pat & Angie Sylvers. Released in 1974, it was produced by Jerry Peters and Keg Johnson.

Track listing
"Na Na Hey Hey Kiss Him Goodbye" – 3:59
"I Got You Babe" – 3:40
"Love Me Tender" – 3:05
"Apples, Peaches, Pumpkin Pie" – 2:25
"Hang On Sloopy" – 2:51
"Stubborn Kind of Fellow" – 3:13
"I Fall In Love Every Day" – 2:40
"1-2-3" – 3:00
"When I'm Near You" – 2:43
"Caress Me Pretty Music" – 3:20
"Montego Bay" – 2:38

External links
 Foster Sylvers – Foster Sylvers Featuring Pat & Angie Sylvers at Discogs

1974 albums
Foster Sylvers albums
Albums produced by Jerry Peters
MGM Records albums